Chromosome 3 open reading frame 67 or C3orf67 is a protein that in humans is encoded by the gene C3orf67.  The function of C3orf67 is not yet fully understood.

Gene 
C3orf67 is located at 3p14.2 on the reverse strand ranging from 58716417 to 59050045 base pairs. The accession number is NP_001338459.1.

Protein

Primary sequence and isoforms 
The coding sequence is 402-2681 base pairs of 3135 base pairs, making up 759 amino acids. C3orf67 has six validated isoforms. Isoform one is the most complete with 16 exons. C3orf67 weighs 84.35 kilodaltons.

Domains and motifs 
There are three functional domains identified for C3orf67

 DUF667
 CM_mono2
 OCRE

Post-translational modifications 

Several post-translational modifications have been predicted for C3orf67 in conserved regions using various bioinformatic prediction tools

 Two nuclear export signals
 Three sumoylation sites
 Two o-glycosylation sites
 One phosphorylation site
 One tyrosine sulfation site

Secondary structure 
The beginning of C3orf67 is predicted to consist of a series of beta strands and a couple alpha helices that coincide with the DUF667 domain. There are also alpha helices predicted in regions that correspond to the CM_mono2 and OCRE domains.

Tertiary structure 

The DUF667 region is predicted to form a tube-like structure from a series of beta sheets.

Homology and Evolution

Paralogs 
There are no known paralogs of C3orf67.

Orthologs 
Orthologs have been identified for C3orf67 in species ranging from fungus, plants, hemichordates, parasites, fish, reptiles, birds, invertebrates, and mammals.

Distant homologs

Expression

Promoter 
The promoter is well conserved across humans, gibbons, baboons, orangutans, cats, squirrels, alpacas, rabbits and mice. There are several high quality transcription factor binding sites. There are also several stem-loop structures that are predicted to be formed in the promoter region, some of which overlap with transcription factor binding sites.

Expression 
C3orf67 is prominently expressed in the liver, tonsils, trachea, ovaries, testis, placenta, and colon. In other tissues it is expressed at low levels. An increase in expression has been linked to small cell lung cancer.

Function 
The protein has been identified as one of seventeen (17) genes that may play a novel role in the intersection of tumor promotion and DNA-damaging stress and may be linked to carcinogenesis.

Interacting Proteins

Transcription factors 
There are three notable transcription factors that are known to be involved in the regulation of cell growth or immune responses:

 V$SMAD3.01
 Smad3 is a transcription factor involved in TGF-beta signaling.
 V$EBF1.01
 Early B-cell factor 1 regulates B cell gene networks.
 V$IK2.01
 Ikaros 2 is a potential regulator for lymphocyte differentiation.

Other interacting proteins 
Several other proteins have been predicted to interact with C3orf67:

 CLK1
 Phosphorylates serine/arginine-rich proteins involved in pre-mRNA processing in the nucleus.
 CDK16 (gene)
 A protein kinase thought to play a role in signal transduction cascades in differentiated cells, exocytosis, and transport of secretory cargo from the ER.
 MARS2
 Mitochondrial methionyl-tRNA synthetase.
 AARS2
 mitochondrial alanyl-tRNA synthetase.
 C12orf60

References